Benton Johnson (born 1928) is an American sociologist and professor emeritus of the University of Oregon's Department of Sociology.

Life 

Benton Johnson is the son of Guy Benton Johnson and Guion Griffis Johnson. He was named Guy Benton Johnson, Jr., after his father, but was called "Benny" and continued to use "Benton" in adulthood.

Johnson's father was a sociologist and anthropologist, while his mother was a noted historian. While in college, Johnson met Miriam Massey. They married on July 21, 1951. Miriam also pursued a successful career in sociology, focusing on family issues and gender roles. Together they had two children.

Academic career 

Johnson is best known for his work related to the theory and typology of religious movements. He received a Bachelor of Arts degree from the University of North Carolina at Chapel Hill and then, in 1954, a doctorate in Sociology from Harvard University. While at Harvard, he was a student of Talcott Parsons.

Prior to joining the Department of Sociology at the University of Oregon, Johnson taught at Guilford College and the University of Texas at Austin. He has chaired both the University of Oregon's Sociology Department and its Department of Religious Studies.

Between 1972 and 1974, Johnson was Editor of the Journal for the Scientific Study of Religion. He has served as president of the Society for the Scientific Study of Religion (1980–81), the Association for the Sociology of Religion (1987) and the Religious Research Association (1995–96).

Awards 

Vanishing Boundaries: the Religion of Protestant Baby Boomers, co-written by Johnson, received the Society for the Scientific Study of Religion's annual book award in 1994.

See also 
 List of cult and new religious movement researchers
 List of sociologists

References 

1928 births
Living people
American sociologists
Sociologists of religion
Researchers of new religious movements and cults
University of North Carolina at Chapel Hill alumni
Harvard University alumni
Guilford College faculty
University of Texas at Austin faculty
University of Oregon faculty